Clinical may refer to:

Healthcare
 Of or about a clinic, a healthcare facility
 Of or about the practice of medicine

Other uses
 Clinical (film), a 2017 American horror thriller

See also

 Clinical chemistry, the analysis of bodily fluids for diagnostic and therapeutic purposes
 Clinical death, the cessation of blood circulation and breathing
 Clinical formulation, a theoretically-based explanation of information obtained from clinical assessment 
 Clinical governance, a systematic approach to maintaining and improving the quality of patient care
 Clinical linguistics, linguistics applied to speech-language pathology
 Clinical psychology, the understanding, preventing, and relieving psychologically-based distress or dysfunction
 Clinical research, to determine the safety and effectiveness of medications etc. 
 Clinical significance, the practical importance of a treatment effect
 Clinical trial,  experiments or observations done in clinical research
 Clinical waste, waste containing infectious (or potentially infectious) materials
 Physical examination
 Secret Clinical, an antiperspirant by Secret (deodorant brand)